Sabon Wuse is the headquarters of Tafa local government area of Niger State of the Federal Republic of Nigeria.

References

Protected areas of Nigeria